K. N. Vijayakumar is a politician from Tamil Nadu, India. He was elected from the Tiruppur (North) constituency to the Fifteenth Tamil Nadu Legislative Assembly as a member of the All India Anna Dravida Munnetra Kazhagam political party in the 2016 Tamil Nadu legislative assembly elections.

References 

All India Anna Dravida Munnetra Kazhagam politicians
Tamil Nadu MLAs 2016–2021
Tamil Nadu MLAs 2021–2026
Year of birth missing (living people)
Living people